The III Corps is a formation of the Indian Army that was formed during World War I in Mesopotamia during its respective campaign. Prior to the reorganization of the British and Indian forces in Mesopotamia, it was designated as the Tigris Corps. 

A new III Corps was formed by the Indian Army during World War II for service in Southeast Asia. The corps fought in the Battle of Singapore where it surrendered in February 1942.

It is located in the state of Nagaland of India in the city of Dimapur, at Rangapahar Military Station.

History

First World War
Initially formed in December 1915, it took part in the Mesopotamian campaign under the command of Frederick Stanley Maude. In November 1916, it was split in two to form the I Corps and III Corps (also known as III (Tigris) Corps).

Among its component divisions during World War I were the Cavalry Division, 3rd (Lahore) Division, 6th (Poona) Division, 7th (Meerut) Division, 12th Indian Division, 13th (Western) Division, 14th Indian Division, 17th Indian Division, and 18th Indian Division.

From 1 January until 3 March 1917 the corps also commanded III (Tigris) Corps Cavalry Regiment, a composite unit comprising squadrons drawn from 1/1st Hertfordshire Yeomanry, 10th Lancers and 32nd Lancers.

Second World War
The Indian III Corps was the primary ground formation that took part in the Malayan Campaign in 1942. It was commanded by Lieutenant-General Sir Lewis "Piggy" Heath.

Indian III Corps was formed in mid-1941 as part of the Malaya Command when the increase in tension in the Far East necessitated the dispatch of large reinforcements to the area to deter Japan. On 7 December 1941 the Corps consisted of the Indian 9th Infantry Division, commanded by Major-General Arthur Edward Barstow, the Indian 11th Infantry Division, commanded by Major-General David Murray-Lyon, a lines of communication Area, and the Penang Fortress. Due to the rapid expansion of the British Indian Army, many of the formations in the Indian divisions were ill-trained and lacked large enough cadres of experienced troops.

The British had plans – Operation Matador and Operation Krohcol – to move forward into the south of Siam to forestall Japanese advances. However, lack of forewarning, combined with caution over upsetting Japan needlessly with precipitate actions, prevented the plans from being implemented. This put the garrison on the defensive, a position from which it never recovered.

III Corps was pushed down the Malayan peninsula by Japanese units, who employed novel tactics. When confronted with an Allied strong point on a road, the Japanese troops would leave a screen in front of the position, and then send infiltrators round through the jungle to outflank the position. Having been surrounded, positions were usually relatively easy to take. III Corps and the rest of the Allied land forces were pushed back to Singapore itself by February 1942. There they endured a short siege before the island surrendered at the direction of Lieutenant-General Arthur Ernest Percival. Some of the prisoners taken from Indian III Corps subsequently joined the Indian National Army.

Post independence
After the independence of India, a new III Corps was raised by the Indian Army on 4 February 1985 and is spread over the North Eastern States of Nagaland, Manipur, Mizoram, Tripura and Meghalaya. At the time of its formation, it consisted of 8 and 57 Mountain Divisions, under its command, in addition to troops of Assam Rifles.  The 8 Mountain Division was moved out to Kashmir in 1990.

The corps is presently based at Dimapur in north east India, and consists of three divisions being responsible for eastern Arunachal Pradesh and the Myanmar border. It is tasked for use in any future Indian war against China.

Structure 
Jane's estimates that it consists of:
2 Mountain Division (Dao Division) - The division joined III Corps in late 2000s and is headquartered at Dinjan, Dibrugarh district, Assam.
 
56 Mountain Division - raised at Zakhama, Nagaland and presently at Likabali, north of the Brahmaputra. It includes 46 Brigade (Dibang) and the 22 Brigade (Lekhapani), though 22 Brigade may shift to 2nd Mountain Division.

57 Mountain Division (Red Shield Division) - headquartered at Leimakhong. Raised in 1966 for counterinsurgency operations in Mizoram. Until 1990, headquartered at Aizawl with III Corps. Globalsecurity.org reports the 57 Mountain Division headquarters are at Masimpur near Silchar. The formation and units of 57 Mountain Division are deployed in some of the remotest corner of Manipur and Indo-Burmese border. 57th Mountain Division took part in the Indo-Pakistani War of 1971 as part of IV Corps. It also successfully conducted Operation Golden Bird in 1995 to eliminate rebels in Northeast India.

Commanders

Reference list

External links
 Australian War Memorial: Remembering 1942 The fall of Singapore, 15 February 1942 
 III Indian Corps History & Personnel 
http://www.orbat.com  (History; Niehorster)

003
Corps of India in World War II
Corps of India in World War I
Military units and formations of the British Empire in World War II
 
Military units and formations established in 1915
Military units and formations disestablished in 1919
Military units and formations established in 1941
Military units and formations disestablished in 1942
Military units and formations established in 1980
Corps of British India